The Atlanta Yacht Club is a private yacht club located in Acworth, Georgia (United States), on the southwest shore of Lake Allatoona.

One-Design racing began with a Penguin fleet the first season. The second season brought out five more organized fleets: Snipes, Thistles, Y-Flyers, a handicap fleet and a power boat fleet. Lasers and Optimists are the latest incorporations.

Fleets and regattas 
Current fleets at the club and their major regattas are:
Y-Flyer fleet 1, Beers Regatta.
Thistle fleet 48, Dixie Regatta.
Snipe fleet 330, Halloween Regatta.

Notable Sailors 
Ted Turner and Tarasa Davis are among Atlanta Yacht Club's most famous sailors.

References

External links 
 Official website

Yacht clubs in the United States
Sailing in Georgia (U.S. state)
1950 establishments in Georgia (U.S. state)